Anthostema madagascariense is a species of flowering plant in the family Euphorbiaceae (spurge family). It is a small to medium-sized tree or large bush, endemic to Madagascar, the Comoro Islands and Mayotte.

Description
The bark is dark red or blackish, and deeply fissured. The leaves are alternate. The leaf blades are leathery, obovate or elliptical, with entire margins, and are borne on short, grooved petioles. The inflorescence is a cyme growing in the axil of a leaf. The individual flowers are either male or female. The female flower has a three or four-lobed perianth and a spreading style, and is surrounded by several male flowers, each with a three or four-toothed perianth, and a single stamen.

Distribution and habitat
This tree grows naturally on the Comoro Islands, Mayotte and eastern Madagascar.

Uses
The timber of Anthostema madagascariense is whitish when freshly cut, turning pink on exposure to the air. It is soft and non-durable, prone to rot and attack by insects, and is little used for construction, but can be worked by hand to make utensils. It may be used in light carpentry, to make boxes or for veneering. It is often a constituent of fibreboard and hardboard, and the latex is used as an adhesive.

References   

Euphorbieae
Flora of Africa
Taxa named by Henri Ernest Baillon